Chaudhary Ghias Ahmed Mela (17 September 1961 – 27 June 2015) was a Pakistani politician and three-time member of the National Assembly of Pakistan (1997–1999, 2002–2007, 2008–2013) from Sargodha. He hails from 'Mela' village of Kot Momin tehsil, in Sargodha District and was an agriculturist by profession. He was a member of the Pakistan Muslim League (Q) (PML-Q) and held the post of senior vice president of the party. Later in 2015, he joined the Pakistan Tehreek-e-Insaf.

He had also served as the chairman of the standing committee for housing and worked under the PML-Q regime of 2002–2007, and as Federal Minister of State for the Ministry of Human Resource Development (2012–2013).

Education 

Mela received his early education from Lawrence College Ghora Gali and Lahore American School. Higher education includes a B.B.A from the University of Evansville, Indiana (U.S.A) and an M.B.A degree from the same university.

Minister of State for Human Resource Development 

Mela  was named the Federal Minister of State of Human Resource development (previously termed Ministry of Labour and Manpower) in June 2012, under the prime ministership of Raja Pervez Ashraf.

Death 
Mela died on 27 June 2015 in the United States due to cardiac arrest. He went to the US for surgery as his heart was enlarging due to a vena cava blockage and chronic smoking, soon after successful heart surgery, he was shifted to the ventilator for few hours for a better oxygen supply, but his lungs failed to perform ample function. His funeral was held in Kot Khuda Baksh Mela village on 1 July 2015, and he was buried in the graveyard of his forefathers.

Mela was married, and has two sons and a daughter.

References

External links
http://gulfnews.com/news/world/pakistan/ashraf-s-cabinet-expansion-includes-15-more-ministers-1.1040865
http://www.dailytimes.com.pk/default.asp?page=2012%5C06%5C26%5Cstory_26-6-2012_pg1_4
http://www.pakvoice.org/politics/punjab/sargodha/na-65/ 
http://www.brecorder.com/pakistan/general-news/64339.html
http://www.na.gov.pk/en/profile.php?uid=110
http://globalleadershipproject.org/content/chaudhry-ghia-ahmed-mela
http://archives.dawn.com/weekly/herald/herald34.htm

2015 deaths
Pakistan Muslim League (Q) politicians
People from Sargodha District
Punjabi people
University of Evansville alumni
1961 births